Eupolyphaga sinensis, is a species of wingless, flightless cockroach in the genus Eupolyphaga, native to Western China and Mongolia. The dried body is used in traditional Chinese medicine.

References

Cockroaches
Insects of Asia
Insects described in 1868